Red Point may refer to:

Geography

Australia

 Red Point, Port Kembla
 Red Point, Twofold Bay

Canada
 Red Point (Nova Scotia), in 

United Kingdom
 Redpoint, a settlement in Highland, Scotland

Business
 Redpoint Ventures, a venture capital and investment firm

Music
 Red Point (EP), the seventh EP by Teen Top

Other
 Redpoint (climbing)